Jermaine Jackson (released internationally as Dynamite) is the tenth studio album by United States singer-songwriter Jermaine Jackson, released in 1984.  It was his debut album with Arista after leaving Motown. The album features then-unknown Whitney Houston and his brothers Michael, Tito and Randy.

Overall, it stands as one of Jermaine Jackson's most commercially successful albums, selling over 900,000 copies in the US to date and being certified Gold by the Recording Industry Association of America (RIAA).

Background 
Jermaine Jackson was Jackson's first of numerous albums released with Arista Records, after leaving Motown, who he had been with for thirteen years. The album was released internationally under the title Dynamite. The album went on to be Jermaine's second-most successful album in the United States, peaking at No. 19 — 13 places below Let's Get Serious — on the main Billboard album chart, but becoming the #1 R&B album on July 7, 1984.

The disc achieved Gold status, eventually surpassing 900,000 in US sales. Internationally, it was Jackson's most successful album, peaking within the charts of four non-US territories. "When the Rain Begins to Fall", originally recorded for the soundtrack of Voyage of the Rock Aliens, was later included on the album after its success as a single.

The album track "Take Good Care of My Heart," a duet with the then relatively unknown American R&B and pop singer Whitney Houston, was also the B-Side of the released "Dynamite" single. The song later appeared on Houston's self-titled debut album, released February 14, 1985 on Arista Records.

The album was re-issued in 2005 in the US with little difference compared to the original album. It was reissued again in Japan in 2009 with "When the Rain Begins to Fall" and two bonus tracks, and again in the US in 2012. This edition also contained "When the Rain Begins to Fall", both bonus tracks on the Japanese edition, as well as three more bonus tracks.

Critical reception 

Jason Elias from Allmusic gave the album a retrospective positive track-by-track view, saying "[Jermaine Jackson] has him doing a slickly produced variant of the R&B/pop his brother was making sound effortless." and concluded "While Jermaine Jacksons not a perfect album, despite the ground covered, it is a strong one."

Singles
"Dynamite" was released as the album's second single, and became Jackson's fourth top 20-charting single, reaching No. 15 on the Billboard Hot 100. Internationally, the song performed less well, reaching No. 46 in France, and No. 19 in New Zealand. "Do What You Do", the album's third single, performed as one of Jackson's best-selling singles to date, reaching the top 20 in the US, as well as topping the Belgium (Flanders) chart, and reaching the top ten in Ireland, Netherlands, and the UK, where it was certified Silver by the BPI. It also reached #40 in Germany, and #12 in France.

"When the Rain Begins to Fall", a duet with Pia Zadora, was originally recorded for the soundtrack of Voyage of the Rock Aliens, and went on to become one of both artists' best-selling singles. Although less successful in the US and UK (respectively peaking at No. 54 and No. 68), the song topped the charts of numerous European territories, including Belgium (Flanders), Netherlands, and France. The song also peaked within the top ten of Austria, Switzerland, and Italy. The song also went Gold in Germany, and Platinum in France. Due to the success of the single, it was included on later pressings of the album.

Track listing

Personnel
 Jermaine Jackson – lead vocals, backing vocals, drum programming (1, 2, 5), arrangements (1, 2, 5), percussion (2-5), keyboards (5), synthesizer bass (5)
 John Barnes – keyboards (1, 2, 4, 5, 6), synthesizer bass (1, 4), Yamaha GS1 (9), Fairlight strings (9)
 Michael Omartian – keyboards (3, 8), percussion (3), arrangements (3, 7, 8), bass (8), backing vocals (8)
 David Ervin – keyboards (6)
 Derek Nakamoto – keyboards (6)
 Michael Sembello – Yamaha GS1 (6), bass  (6), drum programming (6)
 Greg Phillinganes – keyboards (7), arrangements (7)
 Elliot Willensky – acoustic piano (9), arrangements (9)
 Paul Jackson Jr. – guitar (1, 2, 4, 6), arrangements (1, 2)
 Ray Parker Jr. – guitar (3)
 Gregg Arreguin – guitar (4)
 David Williams – guitar (5, 7)
 George Doering – sitar (5)
 Marcus Daniels – guitar (6)
 Michael Landau – guitar (8)
 Freddie Washington – bass (2)
 Nathan East – bass (3, 7)
 Ronnie Foster – synthesizer bass (5)
 Jonathan Moffett – drum programming (1)
 John Robinson – drums (3, 7)
 Don Freeman – drum programming (4), arrangements (4)
 Mike Baird – drums (8)
 Randy Jackson – percussion (2), backing vocals (4)
 George Del Barrio – string arrangements (5, 7)
 Ernie Watts – saxophone solo (7, 8)
 Whitney Houston – backing vocals (2, 7), lead vocals (7)
 Michael Jackson – lead vocals (3), backing vocals (3)
 Tito Jackson – backing vocals (4)
 Portia Griffin – backing vocals (8)
 Yolanda Denise Young – backing vocals (8)

Production
 Producers – Jermaine Jackson (Tracks 1, 2, 4-7 & 9); Michael Omartian (Tracks 3 & 8); Richard Rudolph (Tracks 4 & 6).
 Executive Producer – Clive Davis
 Engineers – Bill Bottrell, John Guess, Brian Malouf, Mike Schumann and Keith Seppanen.
 Mixing – Bill Bottrell
 Recorded at Soundcastle (Hollywood, CA); Yamaha Studios (Glendale, CA); Can-Am Recorders (Tarzana, CA); Lion Share Recording Studio (Los Angeles, CA).
 Art Direction and Design – Ria Lewerke
 Photography – Leon Lecash

Charts

Certifications

References 

1984 albums
Jermaine Jackson albums
Arista Records albums
New wave albums by American artists
Synth-pop albums by American artists